The Royal Victorian Order is a dynastic order of knighthood established in 1896 by Queen Victoria. It recognises distinguished personal service to the British monarch, Canadian monarch, Australian monarch, or New Zealand monarch, members of the monarch's family, or to any viceroy or senior representative of the monarch. The present monarch, King Charles III, is the sovereign of the order, the order's motto is Victoria, and its official day is 20 June. The order's chapel is the Savoy Chapel in London.

There is no limit on the number of individuals honoured at any grade, and admission remains at the sole discretion of the monarch, with each of the order's five grades and one medal with three levels representing different levels of service. While all those honoured may use the prescribed styles of the order – the top two grades grant titles of knighthood, and all grades accord distinct post-nominal letters – the Royal Victorian Order's precedence amongst other honours differs from realm to realm and admission to some grades may be barred to citizens of those realms by government policy.

History

Prior to the close of the 19th century, most general honours within the British Empire were bestowed by the sovereign on the advice of her British ministers, who sometimes forwarded advice from ministers of the Crown in the Dominions and colonies (appointments to the then most senior orders of chivalry, the Most Noble Order of the Garter and the Most Ancient and Most Noble Order of the Thistle, had been made on ministerial advice since the 18th century and were not restored to the personal gift of the sovereign until 1946 and 1947, respectively). Queen Victoria thus established on 21 April 1896 the Royal Victorian Order as a junior and personal order of knighthood that allowed her to bestow directly to an empire-wide community honours for personal services. The organisation was founded a year before Victoria's Diamond Jubilee, so as to give the Queen time to complete a list of first inductees. The order's official day was made 20 June of each year, marking the anniversary of Queen Victoria's accession to the throne.

In 1902, King Edward VII created the Royal Victorian Chain "as a personal decoration for royal personages and a few eminent British subjects" and it was the highest class of the Royal Victorian Order. It is today distinct from the order, though it is officially issued by the chancery of the Royal Victorian Order.

The order was open to foreigners from its inception, the Prefect of Alpes-Maritimes and the Mayor of Nice being the first foreigners to receive the honour in 1896.

Composition

The reigning monarch is at the apex of the Royal Victorian Order as its Sovereign, followed by the Grand Master; the latter position was created in 1937 and was occupied by Queen Elizabeth (later the Queen Mother) from that date until her death in 2002. Queen Elizabeth II then appointed her daughter, Anne, Princess Royal, to the position in 2007. Below the Grand Master are five officials of the organisation: the Chancellor, held by the Lord Chamberlain; the Secretary, held by the Keeper of the Privy Purse and Treasurer to the King; the Registrar, held by the Secretary to the Central Chancery of the Orders of Knighthood; the Chaplain, held by the Chaplain of the King's Chapel of the Savoy; and the Genealogist.

Thereafter follow those honoured with different grades of the order, divided into five levels: the highest two conferring accolades of knighthood and all having post-nominal letters and, lastly, the holders of the Royal Victorian Medal in either gold, silver or bronze. Foreigners may be admitted as honorary members, there are no limits to the number of any grade, and promotion is possible. The styles of knighthood are not used by princes, princesses, or peers in the uppermost ranks of the society, save for when their names are written in their fullest forms for the most official occasions. Retiring Deans of the Royal Peculiars of St George's Chapel at Windsor Castle and Westminster Abbey are customarily inducted as Knights Commander; clergymen appointed to the higher levels of the Royal Victorian Order do not use the associated styles, however, and honorary members are not permitted to hold them at all.

Prior to 1984, the grades of Lieutenant and Member were classified as Members (fourth class) and Members (fifth class), respectively, but both with the post-nominals MVO. On 31 December of that year, Queen Elizabeth II declared that those in the grade of Member (fourth class) would henceforth be Lieutenants with the post-nominals LVO.

List of officers

The current officers of the Royal Victorian Order are as follows:

 Sovereign: The King, since 2022
 Grand Master: The Princess Royal, since 2007
 Chancellor: The Lord Parker of Minsmere, as Lord Chamberlain, since April 2021
 Secretary: Sir Michael Stevens, as Keeper of the Privy Purse, since 2018
 Registrar: Lieutenant Colonel Stephen Segrave, as Secretary of the Central Chancery of the Orders of Knighthood
 Chaplain: The Reverend Canon Thomas Woodhouse, as Chaplain of the King's Chapel of the Savoy, since 2019

Insignia and vestments

Upon admission into the Royal Victorian Order, members are given various insignia. Common for all members is the badge, which is a Maltese cross with a central medallion depicting on a red background the Royal Cypher of Queen Victoria surrounded by a blue ring bearing the motto of the order – victoria (victory) – and surmounted by a Tudor crown. However, there are variations on the badge for each grade of the order: Knights and Dames Grand Cross on certain formal occasions (see below) wear the badge suspended from the Order's collar (chain), but otherwise on a sash passing from the right shoulder to the left hip; Knight Commanders and male Commanders wear the badge on a ribbon at the neck; male Lieutenants and Members wear the badge from a ribbon on the left chest; and women in all grades below Dame Grand Cross wear the badge on a bow pinned at the left shoulder. For Knights and Dames Grand Cross, Commanders, and Lieutenants, the Maltese cross is rendered in white enamel with gold edging, while that for Knights and Dames Commander (on the star) and Members (the badge itself) is in silver. Further, the size of the badge varies by rank, that for the higher classes being larger, and Knights and Dames Grand Cross and Knights and Dames Commander have their crosses surrounded by a star: for the former, an eight-pointed silver star, and for the latter, an eight-pointed silver Maltese cross with silver rays between each arm.

The medal bears the effigy and name of the reigning sovereign at the time of its awarding, as well as the phrase DEI • GRATIA • REX (or REGINA) • F.D. (by the grace of God, King (or Queen), Defender of the Faith), and on the reverse is the Royal Cypher upon an ornamental shield within a laurel wreath. Bars may be awarded to each class of medal for further services, and should recipients be awarded a higher level of medal or be appointed to a grade of the order itself, they may continue to wear their original medal along with the new insignia.

The order's ribbon is blue with red-white-red stripe edging, the only difference being that for foreigners appointed into the society, their ribbon bears an additional central white stripe.

At formal events, or collar days, of which there are 34 throughout the year, such as New Year's Day and royal anniversaries, Knights and Dames Grand Cross wear the Royal Victorian Order's livery collar, consisting of an alternating string of octagonal gold pieces depicting a gold rose on a blue field and gold oblong frames within which are one of four inscriptions: Victoria, Britt. Reg. (Queen of the Britains), Def. Fid. (fidei defensor, or Defender of the Faith), and Ind. Imp. (Empress of India). The chain supports a larger octagonal medallion with a blue enamel surface edged in red and charged with a saltire, over which is an effigy of Queen Victoria; members of the order suspend from this medallion their insignia as a badge apendant. Though after the death of a Knight or Dame Grand Cross their insignia may be retained by their family, the collar must be returned. Knights and Dames Grand Cross also wear a mantle of dark blue satin edged with red satin and lined with white satin, bearing a representation of the order's star on the left side.

Chapel

Since 1938, the chapel of the Royal Victorian Order has been the King's Chapel of the Savoy, in central London, England. However, the population of the order has grown to the point that the Savoy chapel can no longer accommodate the gathering of members held every four years, and St. George's Chapel at Windsor Castle is now employed for the event.

The Sovereign and Knights and Dames Grand Cross of the order are allotted stalls in the Savoy chapel's choir, and on the back of each stall is affixed a brass plate displaying the occupant's name, coat of arms, and date of admission into the organisation. Upon the occupant's death, the plate is retained, leaving the stalls festooned with a record of the order's Knights and Dames Grand Cross since 1938. The only heraldic banners normally on display in the chapel are those of the Sovereign of the  Royal Victorian Order and of the Grand Master of the  Royal Victorian Order as there is insufficient space in the chapel for more knights' and dames' banners or other heraldic devices.

Eligibility and appointment 

Membership in the Royal Victorian Order is conferred by the monarch without ministerial advice on those who have performed personal service for the sovereign, any member of his or her family, or any of his or her Governors-General. All living citizens of any Commonwealth realm, including women since 1936, are eligible for any of the five levels of the order, save for Canadians (see below) and, in practice, Australians (although all classes of the Royal Victorian Order remain in the Australian order of precedence of honours, Elizabeth II never created knights or dames in the Order when the Australian government has been opposed to "titles").

Foreign members will generally be admitted as honorary members of the Royal Victorian Order when the sovereign is making a state visit to the individual's country or a head of state is paying a state visit to the United Kingdom.

Persons have been removed from the order at the monarch's command. Anthony Blunt, a former Surveyor of the Queen's Pictures, was in 1979 stripped of his knighthood after it was revealed that he had been a spy for the Soviet Union. Also, George Pottinger, a senior civil servant, in 1975 lost his membership in both the Order of the Bath and the Royal Victorian Order when he was jailed for corruptly receiving gifts from the architect John Poulson.

Canadians

As admission to the top two levels of the organisation provides for an honorary prefix, Canadians are not normally appointed to these levels as long as the monarch's Canadian ministry adheres to the Nickle Resolution of 1919.

As it was deemed by the Canadian Cabinet to be an honour within the gift of the monarch, the appointment of Canadians to the order resumed in 1972 and eligibility was extended to those who render services to the monarch's representatives in the country; officials within the provincial spheres being included after 1984. Originally, the sovereign chose inductees personally, though the Governor General of Canada and the Canadian Secretary to the King could provide suggestions, some passed to them by the lieutenant governors. The practice of notifying the Prime Minister of Canada of nominees ended in 1982, to distance the order as far from politics as possible.

It was reported in 2008 that some in the Chancellery of Honours at Rideau Hall wished to eliminate the Royal Victorian Order from the Canadian honours system and sometimes contested when a Canadian was appointed; however, no formal changes were ever planned. In Canada, the order has come to be colloquially dubbed as the "Royal Visit Order", as the majority of appointments are made by the sovereign during her tours of the country.

Association

The Royal Victorian Order Association of Canada exists for all Canadians appointed to the order or who have received the Royal Victorian Medal; it is the only such organisation in the Commonwealth realms. Founded by Michael Jackson, the group has, since 2008, gathered biennially.

Precedence

As the Royal Victorian Order is open to the citizens of fifteen countries, each with their own system of orders, decorations, and medals, the RVO's place of precedence varies from country to country. Some are as follows:

In the United Kingdom, the wives of male members of all classes also feature on the order of precedence, as do sons, daughters and daughters-in-law of Knights Grand Cross and Knights Commanders; relatives of Dames, however, are not assigned any special precedence. As a general rule, individuals can derive precedence from their fathers or husbands, but not from their mothers or wives.

Current Knights and Dames Grand Cross

 Sovereign: King Charles III
 Grand Master: Anne, Princess Royal , appointed Dame Grand Cross in 1974; Grand Master since 2007.

Knights and Dames Grand Cross

Honorary Knights and Dames Grand Cross

Honorary Knights and Dames Commander

See also 

 List of Knights Grand Cross of the Royal Victorian Order appointed by Queen Victoria
 List of Knights Commander of the Royal Victorian Order appointed by Queen Victoria
 List of Knights Grand Cross of the Royal Victorian Order appointed by Edward VII
 List of Knights Commander of the Royal Victorian Order appointed by Edward VII
 List of Knights Grand Cross of the Royal Victorian Order appointed by George V
 List of Knights Commander of the Royal Victorian Order appointed by George V
 List of knights and dames of the Royal Victorian Order appointed by Edward VIII
 List of Knights and Dames Grand Cross of the Royal Victorian Order appointed by George VI
 List of Knights and Dames Commander of the Royal Victorian Order appointed by George VI
 List of Knights and Dames Grand Cross of the Royal Victorian Order appointed by Elizabeth II (1952-1977)
 List of Knights and Dames Grand Cross of the Royal Victorian Order appointed by Elizabeth II (1978-2002)
 List of Knights and Dames Grand Cross of the Royal Victorian Order appointed by Elizabeth II (2003–2022)
 List of Knights and Dames Commander of the Royal Victorian Order appointed by Elizabeth II (1952-1977)
 List of Knights and Dames Commander of the Royal Victorian Order appointed by Elizabeth II (1978-2002)
 List of Knights and Dames Commander of the Royal Victorian Order appointed by Elizabeth II (2003–2022)
 List of Knights and Dames Grand Cross of the Royal Victorian Order appointed by Charles III
 List of Knights and Dames Commander of the Royal Victorian Order appointed by Charles III
 Royal Victorian Chain
 Royal Victorian Medal
 List of people who have declined a British honour

Notes

References

Citations

Sources

Further reading

External links 

 
Orders of chivalry of the United Kingdom
1896 establishments in the United Kingdom
Awards established in 1896